The Indian and Foreign Review was an official publication of the Government of India published by the Ministry of Information and Broadcasting, between 1963 and 1988. It replaced March of India.

See also
The Gazette of India

References

Ministry of Information and Broadcasting (India)
1963 establishments in India
1980s disestablishments in India